T-R-O-U-B-L-E is the third studio album by American country music artist Travis Tritt. It was released on Warner Bros. Records in 1992. Five singles were released from the album; in chronological order of release, these were "Lord Have Mercy on the Working Man", "Can I Trust You with My Heart", the title track, "Looking Out for Number One", and "Worth Every Mile". Respectively, these reached numbers 5, 1, 13, 11, and 30 on the Billboard Hot Country Songs charts between 1992 and 1993. The album was certified 2× Platinum by the RIAA for U.S. shipments of two million copies.

Content
"Lord Have Mercy on the Working Man" was the first single released from this album. This song, written by Kostas, features Brooks & Dunn, T. Graham Brown, George Jones, Little Texas, Dana McVicker, Tanya Tucker and Porter Wagoner as backing vocalists on the final chorus. Two cover songs are also included: the title track, originally a single in 1975 for Elvis Presley, and "Leave My Girl Alone", previously recorded by Stevie Ray Vaughan on his 1989 album In Step, and Chicago blues guitarist Buddy Guy before that.

Track listing

Personnel
Adapted from the liner notes.

 Sam Bacco – timpani (2, 6, 9), cymbals (2, 6), crotales (2), tambourine (2, 3, 4, 9), percussion (3), marimba (4), cabasa (4), shaker (4, 6), bass drum (5), spoons (5), wobble board (5), broom (5), chimes (6, 9), gong (6, 9), congas (6), zill (9)
 Richard Bennett – acoustic guitar (5), slide guitar (5)
 Mike Brignardello – bass guitar
 Larry Byrom – slide guitar (1, 3, 10), acoustic guitar (2, 3, 5, 7, 8)
 John Catchings – cello (6, 9)
 John Cowan – backing vocals (1, 3, 4, 6, 7)
 Wendell Cox – electric guitar (5)
 Terry Crisp – baritone steel guitar (2, 6, 9), pedal steel guitar (4, 5, 7), resonator guitar (5)
 David Davidson – violin (6)
 Stuart Duncan – fiddle (4-7)
 Connie Heard – violin (6)
 Jack Holder – electric guitar (1, 2, 3, 7, 8, 10)
 John Jorgenson – electric guitar (3, 4, 6, 7, 9), six-string bass guitar (7)
 Billy Livsey – Wurlitzer electric piano (1, 4), Hammond organ (2, 3, 6, 10), harmonium (2, 9), clavinet (3)
 Dennis Locorriere – backing vocals (7, 8)
 Dana McVicker – backing vocals (1, 2, 3, 4, 6, 8, 9)
 Edgar Meyer – double bass (6, 9), string arrangements (6, 9)
 Mark O'Connor – fiddle (9)
 Bobby Ogdin – piano (1, 8), Hammond organ (1, 8)
 Hargus "Pig" Robbins – piano (all tracks except 5)
 Matt Rollings – piano (5)
 Gary Rossington – electric guitar (8)
 Jimmy Joe Ruggiere – harmonica (1, 3, 5, 6, 7, 8, 10)
 Steve Turner – drums
 Billy Joe Walker Jr. – acoustic guitar (1, 4, 5, 6, 9), electric guitar (1, 2, 3, 4, 5, 7, 8, 10), slide guitar (2)
 Kris Wilkinson – viola (6, 9)
 Dennis Wilson – backing vocals (5)
 Curtis Young – backing vocals (5)
 Reggie Young – electric guitar (2, 3, 6, 9, 10)

Guest vocals on last chorus of "Lord Have Mercy on the Working Man"
Brooks & Dunn
 T. Graham Brown
 George Jones
Little Texas
Dana McVicker
Tanya Tucker
Porter Wagoner

Production
 Gregg Brown – producer
 John Dickson – engineering
 Rob Feaster – recording, mixing (tracks 4, 6, 9)
 Erik Flettrich – engineering
 Carlos Grier – digital editing
 Chris Hammond – recording (track 5)
 John Hampton – mixing (all tracks except 4, 6, 9)
 Clark Hook – engineering
 Bob Ludwig – mastering
 Patrick Kelly – engineering
 Carry Summers – engineering

Charts

Weekly charts

Year-end charts

References

1992 albums
Travis Tritt albums
Warner Records albums